Folon Region is one of the 31 regions of Ivory Coast. Since its establishment in 2011, it has been one of two regions in Denguélé District. The seat of the region is Minignan and the region's population in the 2021 census was 146,209, making it the least-populous region of the country.

Folon is currently divided into two departments: Kaniasso and Minignan.

Natural geography
The majority of the geography of Folon is savannah, but there are forests along the rivers. The forests are threatened by illegal logging and bushfires. The wild fauna of the region includes baboons, warthogs, boars, partridges, francolins, antelopes, waterbucks, bushbucks, rabbits, and boas.

Notes

 
Regions of Denguélé District
States and territories established in 2011
2011 establishments in Ivory Coast